Grumpy Cat's Worst Christmas Ever (referred to onscreen as Grumpy Cat's Worst Christmas Ever! The Movie) is a 2014 made-for-television Christmas comedy film directed by Tim Hill, who also co-wrote the screenplay with Jeff Morris. The film stars Internet celebrity cat Tardar Sauce, also known as "Grumpy Cat", and Megan Charpentier as a young girl who befriends and later adopts Grumpy Cat, only to discover that the two can communicate with one another.

The film premiered on Lifetime on November 29, 2014, to generally negative reviews from critics.

Plot
Grumpy Cat is a lonely and grumpy cat living in a mall pet shop that is slated to be closed. She is bitter at being constantly passed over for other animals in the store, but is surprised to find that she can communicate with Crystal, an equally lonely 12-year-old girl who is shocked that Grumpy Cat can "talk". The two are initially at odds, but start to befriend each other, especially after a high-priced Leonberger dog is dognapped from the pet shop for its value.

Cast
 Grumpy Cat as herself
 Aubrey Plaza as Herself and the voice of Grumpy Cat
 Megan Charpentier as Crystal
 Daniel Roebuck as George
 Russell Peters as Santa Claus
 Shauna Johannesen as Tabby
 David Lewis as Marcus Crabtree
 Tyler Johnston as Gill Brockman
 Evan Todd as Zack
 Isaac Haig as Donny
 Jay Brazeau as Roger
 Stephen Stanton as the voice of JoJo the Dog 
 Chris Williams as the voice of Lance the Gerbil
 Trevor Lissauer as the voice of Jackie the Jack Russell
 Trevor Devall as the voice of Wilson the Cockatoo

Production

The film was created to showcase Tardar Sauce, the subject of an Internet meme which first appeared in 2012. By the end of 2013, the company which manages Grumpy Cat's image was valued at around $1 million. The company is managed by Ben Lashes, who is credited as an Executive Producer on Grumpy Cat's Worst Christmas Ever. Tim Hill, one of the writers, had previously directed Garfield: A Tail of Two Kitties and Alvin and the Chipmunks.

When Plaza was cast to perform Grumpy Cat's voice, she was initially unfamiliar with it, but learned about the cat before production. The film was shot in its entirety before Plaza recorded her lines. She re-drafted around 90% of her dialogue, explaining,
Once I realized that the cat's mouth wasn't going to move, I just kind of went for it, and thought, 'Well, if it's just going to cut to the cat and I can say my line, then I can just comment on other things, too.' The movie kind of has a Mystery Science Theater 3000 vibe to it, so it's like you're getting Grumpy's commentary throughout the whole thing, but then Grumpy is also starring in the story.

Reception
The film was first broadcast at 8pm EST on November 29, 2014, on the Lifetime channel in the United States. A hashtag on Twitter representing the film, #WorstChristmasEver, trended during the first half of the movie. It was watched by 1.7 million viewers.

The film received mostly negative reviews. On review aggregator Rotten Tomatoes, the film holds an approval rating of 27%, based on 11 reviews, and an average rating of 4.17/10.

The A.V. Club and Entertainment Weekly both panned the film. The A.V. Club called it "the largest turd in [Lifetime's] crap crown of original programming...so unforgiving, so psychologically trying, that the process alone leaves the viewer straining to hear the dialogue over the sound of the soul being crushed wholesale, bone and sinew wrenched apart at the joint."

The Guardian, MySA, and St. Louis Post-Dispatch were more positive in their reviews, with the St. Louis Post-Dispatch commenting that although the film was "terrible" they still enjoyed it overall. The Hollywood Reporter also gave the film a positive review, stating "[t]he Christmas miracle of this movie is that Grumpy Cat's Worst Christmas Ever isn't the worst Christmas movie ever," and praising the writing and Aubrey Plaza's voice acting.

See also 
 List of Christmas films
 Santa Claus in film

References

External links
 
 
 
 

Lifetime (TV network) films
2014 television films
2014 films
Christmas television films
American Christmas films
Films about cats
2010s Christmas films
Films directed by Tim Hill
Films scored by Paul Leonard-Morgan